Notophthalmus is a genus of newts. There are three species. The name derives from Greek νῶτον (nōton), meaning "back", and Greek ὀφθαλμός (ophthalmos), meaning "eye".

Description
Notophthalmus species are East American newts similar in shape to the European newts (cf. Triturus). As a distinct characteristic of their own, both sexes have three to four large pores that lie in a row on the temple. The skin is smooth and soft in the water form and the tail is strongly flattened laterally. The back bar, on the other hand, is only narrow. Especially during the mating season, there is a clear sexual dimorphism: the males have very strong rut callosities consisting of 10 to 12 horn platelets on the inside of the hind legs, a strongly thickened tail as well as horny toe tips and a spherically arched cloaca. The latter is truncated conical in the females.

Species 
Species recognized as of October 2019:

References 

Animal Diversity Web: Notophthalmus viridescens

Newts
Amphibian genera
Taxa named by Constantine Samuel Rafinesque